The 1986–87 Arkansas State Indians men's basketball team was Arkansas State University from Jonesboro, Arkansas in the 1986–87 season. Led by third year head coach Nelson Catalina, Arkansas State made their first postseason appearance since their transition to NCAA Division I in 1975. Catalina remained head coach at ASU until 1995. Arkansas State faced University of Arkansas in the first round of the NIT, their only meeting in men's basketball.

Postseason results
Southland Conference Tournament
3/3/1987 Vs. Louisiana-Monroe - W, 81-80 @ Thomas Assembly Center, Ruston, LA
3/4/1987 Vs. McNeese State - W, 60-59 @ Thomas Assembly Center, Ruston, LA
3/5/1987 Vs. Louisiana Tech - L, 51-58 @ Thomas Assembly Center, Ruston, LA
National Invitation Tournament
3/13/1987 Vs. Arkansas - L, 64-67 OT @ Barnhill Arena, Fayetteville, AR

References

Arkansas State Red Wolves men's basketball seasons
Arkansas State
Arkansas State